Samuel Scheidt (baptised 3 November 1587 – 24 March 1654) was a German composer, organist and teacher of the early Baroque era.

Life and career
Scheidt was born in Halle, and after early studies there, he went to Amsterdam to study with Sweelinck, the distinguished Dutch composer, whose work had a clear influence on Scheidt's style.  On his return to Halle, Scheidt became court organist, and later Kapellmeister, to the Margrave of Brandenburg.  Unlike many German musicians, for example Heinrich Schütz, he remained in Germany during the Thirty Years' War, managing to survive by teaching and by taking a succession of smaller jobs until the restoration of stability allowed him to resume his post as Kapellmeister. When Samuel Scheidt lost his job because of Wallenstein, he was appointed in 1628 as musical director of three churches in Halle, including the Market Church.

Scheidt was the first internationally significant German composer for the organ, and represents the flowering of the new north German style, which occurred largely as a result of the Protestant Reformation.  In south Germany and some other countries of Europe, the spiritual and artistic influence of Rome remained strong, so most music continued to be derivative of Italian models.  Cut off from Rome, musicians in the newly Protestant areas readily developed styles that were much different from those of their neighbours.

Scheidt's music is in two principal categories:  instrumental music, including a large amount of keyboard music, mostly for organ; and sacred vocal music, some of which is a cappella and some of which uses a basso continuo or other instrumental accompaniment. In his numerous chorale preludes, Scheidt often used a "patterned variation" technique, in which each phrase of the chorale uses a different rhythmic motive, and each variation is more elaborate than the previous one, until the climax of the composition is reached.  In addition to his chorale preludes, he wrote numerous fugues, suites of dances (which were often in a cyclic form, sharing a common ground bass) and fantasias.

Works
 Scheidt's complete works are published by Breitkopf & Härtel in a series of 16 volumes edited by Gottlieb Harms, Christhard Mahrenholz and Christoph Wolff. 
 A new scholarly edition of Scheidt's Tabulatura nova (1624) is edited by Harald Vogel (Breitkopf & Härtel, 1994).
 Scheidt's works are represented in many collections of chorale preludes by various authors, including:
 The Church Organist's Golden Treasury (three volumes), edited by Carl F. Pfatteicher and Archibald T. Davison. (Theodore Presser Co., Pennsylvania)
 80 Chorale Preludes from the 17th and 18th Centuries, edited by Hermann Keller (Peters)
 Chorale Preludes by Old Masters, edited by Karl Straube (Peters) (Also available in a reprint edition from Masters Music Publications)
 Free scores are available for download from:

References and further reading
 Manfred Bukofzer, Music in the Baroque Era.  New York, W.W. Norton & Co., 1947.  
 'Samuel Scheidt', The New Grove Dictionary of Music and Musicians, ed. Stanley Sadie.  20 vol.  London, Macmillan Publishers Ltd., 1980.  
Cleveland Johnson, "In the Trenches with Johann and Caspar Plotz: a rediscovered Gebrauchstabulatur from the Scheidt Circle," 2001. Online

See also
 German organ schools

References

1587 births
1654 deaths
17th-century classical composers
17th-century German people
German Baroque composers
German male classical composers
German classical organists
German male organists
Organists and composers in the North German tradition
People from Halle (Saale)
Pupils of Jan Pieterszoon Sweelinck
17th-century male musicians
Male classical organists